Grigor Vachkov, often called Grishata (26 May 1932 – 18 March 1980) was a Bulgarian theater and film actor, honored with the award of "People's actor" in the People's Republic of Bulgaria. He had more than 41 appearances and leading roles in the Bulgarian cinema.

Vachkov got a broad popularity after the role of Mitko the Bomb in the TV series At Each Kilometer (1969–71). Despite his death in 1980, he remains as one of the leading actors in the history of the Bulgarian cinematography of that time. During the 1960s and 1970s, Vachkov starred in classic film productions as Torrid Noon (1965), The Tied Up Balloon (1967) both written by Yordan Radichkov,  Whale (1970) directed by Petar B. Vasilev, The Kindest Person I Know (1973), The Last Summer (1974) also written by Radichkov,  Almost a Love Story (1980),  The Truck (1980) and especially his role as Banko in Manly Times (1977) directed by Eduard Zahariev. Vachkov is also known for his numerous appearances on the stage of the Satirical Theatre „Aleko Konstantinov“, Sofia.

Biography and career 
He was born as Grigor Vachkov Grigorov on 26 May 1932 in the village of Tranchovitsa, Levski Municipality, Bulgaria. In 1955 he graduated from the Krastyo Sarafov National Academy for Theatre and Film Arts. After the graduation, Vachkov was appointed in the Vratsa Theatre for two years. In 1957 he joined the troupe of the newly founded Satirical Theatre „Aleko Konstantinov“ in Sofia. His debut in films came in 1960. The TV series Every Kilometer (1969–71), where he plays the role of Mitko the Bomb, brought him a wide popularity. Vachkov took part in films that gained international success such as The Last Summer (1974) and Manly Times (1977). His last film was Mera spored Mera. He died at the beginning of shooting and the script had to be changed so that the film could be finished.

He is the father of the actress Martina Vachkova and was a good friend of the writer Yordan Radichkov.

Partial filmography

 Sterne (1959) - Montyor v rabotilnitzata (Repair-man)
 Dom na dve ulitzi (1960) - Guni Hunata
 Hitar Petar (1960)
 Bednata ulitza (1960)
 Prizori (1961)
 Hronika na chuvstvata (1962) - Iliycho
 Tyutyun (1962)
 Smart nyama (1963) - Pesho
 Neprimirimite (1964) - Vaklin
 Verigata (1964) - Karutzaryat
 Neveroyatna istoriya (1964) - Shofyorat (The Driver)
 Antike Münze, Die (1965) - Boncho
 Goreshto pladne (1965) - Selyanin (A peasant)
 Dzhesi Dzeyms sreshtu Lokum Shekerov (1966) - Lokum Shekerov
 Privarzaniyat balon (1967) - Chovekat s pishtova (Man with gun)
 Gibelta na Aleksander Veliki (1968) - Aleksander Karev
 Byalata staya (1968) - Kloun
 Man of La Mancha (1968, TV musical)
 Tango (1969) - Ilyo Mitovski
 Beliyat kon (1969, Short) - Dzheri
 Na vseki kilometar (1969, TV Series) - Mitko 'Bombata'
 Kit (1970) - Kapitanat
 Knyazat (1970) - Zografat
 Na vseki kilometar — II (1971, TV Series) - Mitko Bombata
 Byagstvo v Ropotamo (1973) - Yusuf
 Nay — dobriyat chovek, kogoto poznavam (1973) - Semo Vlachkov
 Vetchni vremena (1974) - Gunchev
 Posledno lyato (1974) - Ivan Efreytorov
 Selkor (1974) - Mangafata
 Spomen za bliznachkata (1976) - Parvan
 Mazhki vremena'''(1977) - Banko
 Sreshtu vyatara (1977) - Kapitan vtori rang Grigorov
 Utroto e nepovtorimo (1978) - Michev
 Pokriv (1978) - Murgaviya
 Vsichki i nikoy (1978) - Mustafa
 Instrument li e gaydata? (1978) - Popat
 Toplo (1978) - Maystor
 Yumrutzi v prastta (1980) - Birnikat Tasho
 Pochti lyubovna istoriya (1980) - Parushev
 Trite smurtni gryaha (1980) - Mitar
 Vazdushniyat chovek (1980) - Bay Foti
 Kamionat (1980) - Dedleto
 Mera spored mera (1981) - Apostol voevoda
 Mera spored mera'' (1988, TV Series) - Apostol Petkov Enidzhevardarskoto Sontze (final appearance)

References

Sources

External links
 
 

1932 births
Bulgarian male film actors
Bulgarian male stage actors
Bulgarian male television actors
People from Levski, Pleven Province
Burials at Central Sofia Cemetery
1980 deaths
20th-century Bulgarian male actors